Abān ibn Muʿāwiya ibn Hishām ibn ʿAbd al-Malik  (died 751) was an Umayyad prince and commander who led a failed revolt against the Abbasid Caliphate shortly after the toppling of the Umayyad Caliphate in 750.

Life
Aban was a son of the Umayyad prince and commander Mu'awiya ibn Hisham and grandson of Caliph Hisham ibn Abd al-Malik. During the Third Muslim Civil War, he joined his uncle Sulayman ibn Hisham, who defected to the Kharijites against the Umayyad caliph Marwan II. After the Kharijites' defeat, he led remnants of their forces, mostly the Syrian former troops of Sulayman, who had since fled Iraq, and joined the Alid rebel Abdallah ibn Mu'awiya at his stronghold of Istakhr in Iran. Aban was routed outside Istakhr by Marwan II's general, Amir ibn Dubara, who captured Aban, but released him.

During the Abbasid Revolution in 749–750, Marwan II and the bulk of his army were routed by the Abbasids at the Battle of the Zab. The Abbasids proceeded to conquer the Umayyads' Syrian heartland. An Umayyad prince, Abu Muhammad al-Sufyani, led a revolt against the Abbasids in the northern and central Syrian districts of Qinnasrin and Hims, but it was defeated. Abu Muhammad's nephew, al-Abbas ibn Muhammad al-Sufyani, then raised a revolt in Aleppo against the Abbasid governor Abdallah ibn Ali, but this was also suppressed. Abdallah ibn Ali marched northward and crushed a rebellion in Samosata by the pro-Umayyad troops of the Jazira led by Ishaq ibn Muslim al-Uqayli.

The remnants of the pro-Umayyad revolts in Syria and the Jazira coalesced around Aban. While Abdallah ibn Ali was on an expedition against the Byzantines in 751, Aban marched against him. Abdallah ibn Ali, hearing of Aban's movements, dispatched units to intercept the pro-Umayyad rebels. Aban's army was put to flight, with Aban escaping to Kaysum near Samosata, where he barricaded himself. Abdallah ibn Ali abandoned the Byzantine campaign to confront Aban, who was defeated and captured. In line with an interpretation of a Qur'anic punishment of rebels, the Abbasids had Aban's hands and feet cut off. Afterward, he was paraded through various Syrian cities under a banner proclaiming: "this is Aban ibn Mu'awiya, paladin of the Umayyads".

Pro-Umayyad revolts continued in the months following Aban's death, but they were all suppressed. A son of Aban, Ubayd Allah, escaped the persecutions of the Umayyad family in Syria, eventually joining Aban's brother, Abd al-Rahman ibn Mu'awiya, who established the Umayyad Emirate of Cordoba in Islamic Spain in 756.

References

Bibliography

751 deaths
8th-century Arabs
8th-century people from the Abbasid Caliphate
Umayyad dynasty
Rebels from the Abbasid Caliphate
Prisoners and detainees of the Abbasid Caliphate